Pääskyvuori (Finnish; Svalberga in Swedish) is a district in the Itäharju-Varissuo ward of the city of Turku, in Finland. It is located to the east of the city between Varissuo and Itäharju and is largely a low-density residential suburb. Pääskyvuori also includes the more densely built area of Laukkavuori. The former television tower located in the district is the tallest free-standing structure (122 m) in the Turku area.

The current population of Pääskyvuori is 4,482, and it is increasing at an annual rate of 0.18%. 20.91% of the district's population are under 15 years old, while 13.43% are over 65. The district's linguistic makeup is 92.24% Finnish, 3.32% Swedish, and 4.44% other.

See also
 Districts of Turku
 Districts of Turku by population

Districts of Turku